Andrew Adelson (born July 28, 1954) is an American television producer.

Biography
Adelson is the son Lori (née Kaufman) and Merv Adelson. He has one sister and a brother: Ellen Adelson Ross and Gary Adelson.

Filmography

References

External links

American television producers
Jewish American television producers
American people of Russian-Jewish descent
1954 births
Living people
Adelson family